Parachalciope inornata is a moth of the family Noctuidae first described by William Jacob Holland in 1894. It is found in the Democratic Republic of the Congo, Ghana and Gabon.

References

Catocalinae
Fauna of Gabon
Moths of Africa